Bitches Brew is a studio album by American jazz trumpeter, composer, and bandleader Miles Davis. It was recorded from August 19 to 21, 1969, at Columbia's Studio B in New York City and released on March 30, 1970 by Columbia Records. It marked his continuing experimentation with electric instruments that he had featured on his previous record, the critically acclaimed In a Silent Way (1969). With these instruments, such as the electric piano and guitar, Davis departed from traditional jazz rhythms in favor of loose, rock-influenced arrangements based on improvisation. The final tracks were edited and pieced together by producer Teo Macero.

The album initially received a mixed critical and commercial response, but it gained momentum and became Davis' highest-charting album on the U.S. Billboard 200, peaking at No. 35. In 1971, it won a Grammy Award for Best Large Jazz Ensemble Album. In 1976, it became Davis' first gold album to be certified by the Recording Industry Association of America.

In subsequent years, Bitches Brew gained recognition as one of jazz's greatest albums and a progenitor of the jazz rock genre, as well as a major influence on rock and '70s crossover musicians. In 1998, Columbia released The Complete Bitches Brew Sessions, a four-disc box set that includes the original album and previously unreleased material. In 2003, the album was certified platinum, reflecting shipments of one million copies.

Background and recording

By 1969, Davis' core working band consisted of Wayne Shorter on soprano saxophone, Dave Holland on bass, Chick Corea on electric piano, and Jack DeJohnette on drums. The group, minus DeJohnette, recorded In a Silent Way (1969), which also featured Joe Zawinul, John McLaughlin, Tony Williams, and Herbie Hancock. The album marked the beginning of Davis' "electric period", incorporating instruments such as the electric piano and guitar and jazz fusion styles. For his next studio album, Davis wished to explore his electronic and fusion style even further. While touring with his five-piece from the spring to August 1969, he introduced new pieces for his band to play, including early versions of what became "Miles Runs the Voodoo Down", "Sanctuary", and "Spanish Key". At this point in his career Davis was influenced by contemporary rock and funk music, Zawinul's playing with Cannonball Adderley, and the work of English composer Paul Buckmaster.

In August 1969, Davis gathered his band for a rehearsal, one week prior to the booked recording sessions. As well as his five-piece, they were joined by Zawinul, McLaughlin, Larry Young, Lenny White, Don Alias, Juma Santos, and Bennie Maupin. Davis had written simple chord lines, at first for three pianos, which he expanded into a sketch of a larger scale composition. He presented the group with some "musical sketches" and told them they could play anything that came to mind as long as they play off of his chosen chord. Davis had not arranged each piece because he was unsure of the direction the album was to take and that what was produced came from an improvisational process, "not some prearranged shit."

Davis booked Columbia's Studio B in New York City from August 19–21, 1969. The session on August 19 began at 10 a.m., the band attempting "Bitches Brew" first. Everyone was set up in a half-circle with Davis and Shorter in the middle. In Lenny White’s words:

As usual with Davis' recording sessions during this period, tracks were recorded in sections. Davis gave a few instructions: a tempo count, a few chords or a hint of melody, and suggestions as to mood or tone. Davis liked to work this way; he thought it forced musicians to pay close attention to one another, to their own performances, or to Davis' cues, which could change at any moment. On the quieter moments of "Bitches Brew", for example, Davis' voice is audible, giving instructions to the musicians: snapping his fingers to indicate tempo, or, in his distinctive voice, saying, "Keep it tight" or telling individuals when to solo—e.g., saying "John" during the title track. "John McLaughlin" and "Sanctuary" were also put down during the August 19 session. Towards the end the group rehearsed "Pharaoh's Dance".

Despite his reputation as a "cool", melodic improviser, much of Davis' playing on this album is aggressive and explosive, often playing fast runs and venturing into the upper register of the trumpet. His closing solo on "Miles Runs the Voodoo Down" is particularly noteworthy in this regard. Davis did not perform on the short piece "John McLaughlin".

Album title
It is not known where the album title came from, and there are various theories as to where it originates. Some believe it was a reference to women in Davis' life who were introducing him to cultural changes in the '60s. Other explanations have been given.

Post-production
Significant editing was made to the recorded music. Short sections were spliced together to create longer pieces, and various effects were applied to the recordings. Paul Tingen reports:

Though Bitches Brew was in many ways revolutionary, perhaps its most important innovation was rhythmic. The rhythm section for this recording consists of two bassists (one playing bass guitar, the other double bass), two to three drummers, two to three electric piano players, and a percussionist, all playing at the same time. As Paul Tanner, Maurice Gerow, and David Megill explain, "like rock groups, Davis gives the rhythm section a central role in the ensemble's activities. His use of such a large rhythm section offers the soloists wide but active expanses for their solos."

Tanner, Gerow and Megill further explain that "the harmonies used in this recording move very slowly and function modally rather than in a more tonal fashion typical of mainstream jazz.... The static harmonies and rhythm section's collective embellishment create a very open arena for improvisation.  The musical result flows from basic rock patterns to hard bop textures, and at times, even passages  that are more characteristic of free jazz." The solo voices heard most prominently on this album are the trumpet and the soprano saxophone, respectively of Miles and Wayne Shorter. Notable also is Bennie Maupin's bass clarinet present on four tracks.

The technology of recording, analog tape, disc mastering, and inherent recording time constraints had, by the late sixties, expanded beyond previous limitations and sonic range for the stereo, vinyl album and Bitches Brew reflects this. In it are long-form performances that encompass entire improvised suites with rubato sections, tempo changes or the long, slow crescendo more common to a symphonic orchestral piece or Indian raga form than the three-minute rock song. Starting in 1969, Davis' concerts included some of the material that would become Bitches Brew.

Release
Bitches Brew was released in March 1970. It gained commercial momentum for the next four months and peaked at No. 35 on the U.S. Billboard 200 for the week of July 4, 1970. This remains Davis' best performance on the chart. On September 22, 2003, the album was certified platinum by the RIAA for selling one million copies in the U.S.

In addition to the standard two channel stereo version, the album was also mixed for four channel quadraphonic sound. A quad LP version was released by Columbia, using the SQ matrix system, in 1971. The album was reissued by Sony in Japan in 2018 on the Super Audio CD format containing both the complete stereo and quadraphonic mixes.

Reception and legacy

Reviewing for Rolling Stone in 1970, Langdon Winner said Bitches Brew shows Davis' music expanding in "beauty, subtlety and sheer magnificence", finding it "so rich in its form and substance that it permits and even encourages soaring flights of imagination by anyone who listens". He concluded that the album would "reward in direct proportion to the depth of your own involvement". Village Voice critic Robert Christgau deemed it "good music that's very much like jazz and something like rock", naming it the year's best jazz album and Davis "jazzman of the year" in his ballot for Jazz & Pop magazine. Years later, he had lost some enthusiasm about the album; in Christgau's Record Guide: Rock Albums of the Seventies (1981), he called Bitches Brew "a brilliant wash of ideas, so many ideas that it leaves an unfocused impression", with Tony Williams' steadier rock rhythms from In a Silent Way replaced by "subtle shades of Latin and funk polyrhythm that never gather the requisite fervor". He concluded that the music sounded "enormously suggestive, and never less than enjoyable, but not quite compelling. Which is what rock is supposed to be."

Selling more than one million copies since it was released, Bitches Brew was viewed by some writers in the 1970s as what spurred jazz's renewed popularity with mainstream audiences that decade. As Michael Segell wrote in 1978, jazz was "considered commercially dead" by the 1960s until the album's success "opened the eyes of music-industry executives to the sales potential of jazz-oriented music". This led to other fusion records that "refined" Davis' new style of jazz and sold millions of copies, including Head Hunters (1973) by Herbie Hancock and George Benson's 1976 album Breezin'. Tom Hull, who would later become a jazz critic, has said, "Back in the early '70s we used to listen to Bitches Brew as late night chill-out music – about the only jazz I ran into at the time." According to independent scholar Jane Garry, Bitches Brew defined and popularized the jazz fusion genre, also known as jazz-rock, but it was hated by a number of purists. Jazz critic and producer Bob Rusch recalled, "this to me was not great Black music, but I cynically saw it as part and parcel of the commercial crap that was beginning to choke and bastardize the catalogs of such dependable companies as Blue Note and Prestige.... I hear it 'better' today because there is now so much music that is worse." Despite the controversy the album stirred among the jazz community, it nonetheless managed to top DownBeat's annual critics' poll in 1970.

The Penguin Guide to Jazz called Bitches Brew "one of the most remarkable creative statements of the last half-century, in any artistic form. It is also profoundly flawed, a gigantic torso of burstingly noisy music that absolutely refuses to resolve itself under any recognized guise." In 2003, the album was ranked number 94 on Rolling Stone magazine's list of the 500 greatest albums of all time (it went down one spot 9 years later). In the 2020 reboot of the list, the album's rank climbed to number 87. Along with this accolade, the album has been ranked at or near the top of several other magazines' "best albums" lists in disparate genres.  The album was also included in the book 1001 Albums You Must Hear Before You Die.

Experimental jazz drummer Bobby Previte considered Bitches Brew to be "groundbreaking": "How much groundbreaking music do you hear now?  It was music that you had that feeling you never heard quite before.  It came from another place.  How much music do you hear now like that?" Thom Yorke, singer of the English rock band Radiohead, cited it as an influence on their 1997 album OK Computer: "It was building something up and watching it fall apart, that's the beauty of it. It was at the core of what we were trying to do." The singer Bilal names it among his 25 favorite albums, citing Davis' stylistic reinvention. Rock and jazz musician Donald Fagen criticized the album as "essentially just a big trash-out for Miles ... To me it was just silly, and out of tune, and bad. I couldn't listen to it. It sounded like [Davis] was trying for a funk record, and just picked the wrong guys. They didn't understand how to play funk. They weren't steady enough."

Track listing

Personnel

Musicians

"Bitches Brew"
"John McLaughlin" (omit Brooks, Shorter and Davis)
"Sanctuary" (omit McLaughlin, Maupin, Brooks and White)

 Miles Davis – trumpet
 Wayne Shorter – soprano saxophone
 Bennie Maupin – bass clarinet
 Joe Zawinul – electric piano (left)
 Chick Corea – electric piano (right)
 John McLaughlin – electric guitar
 Dave Holland – bass
 Harvey Brooks – electric bass
 Lenny White – drum set (left)
 Jack DeJohnette – drum set (right)
 Don Alias – congas
 Juma Santos (credited as "Jim Riley") – shaker, congas

"Miles Runs the Voodoo Down"
 Miles Davis – trumpet
 Wayne Shorter – soprano saxophone
 Bennie Maupin – bass clarinet
 Joe Zawinul – electric piano (left)
 Chick Corea – electric piano(right)
 John McLaughlin – electric guitar
 Dave Holland – electric bass
 Harvey Brooks – electric bass
 Don Alias – drum set (left)
 Jack DeJohnette – drum set (right)
 Juma Santos (credited as "Jim Riley") – congas

"Spanish Key"
"Pharaoh's Dance"
 Miles Davis – trumpet
 Wayne Shorter – soprano saxophone
 Bennie Maupin – bass clarinet
 Joe Zawinul – electric piano (left)
 Larry Young – electric piano (center)
 Chick Corea – electric piano (right)
 John McLaughlin – electric guitar
 Dave Holland – bass
 Harvey Brooks – electric bass
 Lenny White – drum set (left)
 Jack DeJohnette – drum set (right)
 Don Alias – congas
 Juma Santos (credited as "Jim Riley") – shaker

"Feio"
 Miles Davis – trumpet
 Wayne Shorter – soprano saxophone
 Bennie Maupin – bass clarinet
 Joe Zawinul – electric piano (left)
 Chick Corea – electric piano (right)
 John McLaughlin – electric guitar
 Dave Holland – electric bass
 Billy Cobham – drum set (left)
 Jack DeJohnette – drum set (right)
 Airto Moreira – percussion and cuica

Production
 Teo Macero – producer
 Frank Laico – engineer (August 19, 1969 session)
 Stan Tonkel – engineer (all other sessions)
 Mark Wilder – mastering
 Mati Klarwein – cover painting
 Bob Belden – reissue producer
 Michael Cuscuna – reissue producer

Charts

Certifications

See also 
 Bitches Brew Live (Sony/Legacy, 2011)
 Memo from producer asking for advice about the title.

References 

Sources

External links
 Salon Entertainment: a Master at dangerous play
 A history of jazz fusion
 Miles Davis – The Electric Period
 Article by Paul Tingen: Complete Bitches Brew Sessions boxed set at the Miles Beyond site
 Article by Paul Tingen: In a Silent Way and Bitches Brew
 The Sorcerer of Jazz by Adam Shatz, NY Review of Books, September 29, 2016 issue

Miles Davis albums
Grammy Hall of Fame Award recipients
1970 albums
Columbia Records albums
Legacy Recordings albums
Jazz fusion albums by American artists
Avant-garde jazz albums
Albums produced by Teo Macero
Albums recorded at CBS 30th Street Studio
Albums with cover art by Mati Klarwein
Grammy Award for Best Large Jazz Ensemble Album